Blue Devil (Daniel Cassidy) is a superhero appearing in American comic books published by DC Comics. He first appeared in a special insert published in Fury of Firestorm #24 (June 1984). That story led directly into Blue Devil #1, also cover dated June 1984. He was created by Dan Mishkin, Gary Cohn, and Paris Cullins. The Blue Devil comic book ran for 31 issues and one annual. Blue Devil later appeared as a regular character in Shadowpact which ran for 25 issues.

Dan Cassidy was working as a stuntman and special effects specialist in Hollywood when he created the Blue Devil suit, complete with a built-in exoskeleton, specifically designed for the production of a Blue Devil movie. During filming, the demon Nebiros was unleashed from within an ancient temple and, thinking Cassidy was an actual demon, tried to drain his demonic powers with blasts of magic. Instead, the blasts permanently bonded the suit to Cassidy. This unnatural fusion of magic and technology caused him to experience unusual events and draw the attention of otherworldly beings. Horrified at the prospect of being stuck in the suit forever, Cassidy sought ways to separate himself from it, becoming a reluctant superhero along the way.

Cassidy was eventually transformed into an actual demon after making a deal with the demon Neron. Regretting the deal, Blue Devil decided to fight occult evil, often alongside the other members of Shadowpact.

Cassidy's original trident was a mechanical device that he designed himself, but, after being turned into an actual demon, he acquired the magical "Trident of Lucifer" to help combat demons.

Blue Devil has appeared in the animated series Justice League Unlimited and Young Justice as well as the live-action DC Universe series Swamp Thing, in which he was portrayed by Ian Ziering.

Concept and creation
Gary Cohn recounted how he and writing partner Dan Mishkin created Blue Devil: Our editor for a number of things we were doing was a guy named Dave Manak. At this point, Dan [Mishkin] was living in Michigan and I was in New York. I was the point guy who went to the DC office once a week and schmoozed the editors. One day Manak says, "Ditko’s been hanging around the office and he really wants something to do. Do you think you and Dan can come up for something for him?" I went home and I called Dan and told him about this, and we were both very excited. Ditko was the guy who created Spider-Man and Dr. Strange, and we were gaga for Ditko! ... We decided to do something that takes something from every Marvel character we ever loved. Let’s take Iron Man, the guy in the costume; the Thing, the tragedy of the guy stuck in a shape he didn’t want; and a light-hearted, bouncy approach and a character who was going to move like Spider-Man. ... And we wanted something like the Green Goblin. How about Blue Devil? We called him that because Dan’s wife is from North Carolina and he was a Blue Devils fan. Then we started creating Blue Devil and thinking, "Ditko is going to love this!" We created this great proposal, and it was everything that we knew was going to set Ditko’s light on high beam. We took it in to Manak and he gave it to Ditko. Ditko looked at it and said, "I’ll do it if I have to, but this is really not my kind of stuff at all".

However, Manak liked the proposal and suggested that they show it to artist Paris Cullins. Cullins was immediately enthusiastic, and Blue Devil was given his own series.

Blue Devil's costume and general visual appearance were chiefly designed by Cohn; Cullins came up with the belt design.

Publication history
Co-writer Gary Cohn recounted that "the first six issues [of Blue Devil], I was living in
Brooklyn and Paris [Cullins] was living in Philly. Paris was kind of a vagabond spirit. He would show up in New York on the train with his sketchbook, his artist satchel, and his toothbrush, and he would come to my place and stay for three or four days. We would spend the whole time creating plots and visuals as we went, laughing hysterically. We were constantly calling Dan [Mishkin]. It was not the stiff process of writing a script, giving it to the artist, or even writing a plot and giving it to an artist. It was a very organic collaboration". Following issue #6, Cullins left the series, and both Mishkin and Cohn felt that none of the succeeding artists were able to capture the combination of thrills and comedy that they wanted the series to have.

The first Blue Devil series was intentionally written as a humorous and light-hearted comic book story, but this light-hearted style was discarded with later appearances of the character.

Fictional character biography
Daniel Patrick Cassidy is a special effects wizard and stuntman hired to create and play the title character in the movie Blue Devil. To that end Cassidy creates a full-body costume with a hidden powered exoskeleton and built-in special-effects devices. When two of his co-stars accidentally free a demon named Nebiros, Cassidy uses his costume to drive the demon back, but not before being blasted with mystical energy. After the fight, Cassidy finds that the blast has permanently grafted the Blue Devil costume to his body.

Cassidy quickly finds himself embroiled in repeated adventures and conflicts with supervillains, as his newfound status has turned him into a "weirdness magnet". After failing to find a way to remove his costume, Cassidy starts to enjoy his new lifestyle, and becomes more and more comfortable as a superhero, even accepting a place in the Justice League of America. He gains a sidekick when Eddie Bloomberg, his former gofer and devoted fan, designs a suit similar to his own to adventure as Kid Devil. Eventually, he moves into "The House of Weirdness" with Cain the Caretaker as his superintendent.

Blue Demon and later alliances
Seeking more fame and thrills, Blue Devil is approached by the demon Neron, who is known for offering Faustian bargains to heroes and villains alike. Neron offers Cassidy fame as an actor, requiring an act of destruction as payment. Neron sends Cassidy to destroy an unmanned electrical substation in the desert. Believing it to be a relatively harmless act, having checked that nobody was working that night and a relay station would kick in to carry the load, Blue Devil complies and inadvertently causes the death of Marla Bloom, the aunt of Cassidy's best friend Eddie, as the resulting power outage in other electrical towers causes a crash that kills Marla. The story of his personal loss is enough to attract several movie offers.

Opposing Neron, Cassidy is able to partly foil the demon's short-term plans, but he dies in the process. Cassidy's death is short-lived, as he is restored to life as a real devil, no longer a man in an organic suit. Ironically, Cassidy had been a devout Catholic, but now is unable to set foot on consecrated ground without harmfully bursting into flame.

Blue Devil joins the Justice League again, until his second death at the hands of Mist, who showers him with holy water. Blue Devil is resurrected again by Sebastian Faust, who hopes to gain his assistance restarting the fires of Hell during the Day of Judgment storyline. Blue Devil has a chance to confront Nebiros, empowered by a magic trident seemingly given by the King of Lies himself. Blue Devil stalls Nebiros, stripping him of his trident and allowing Firestorm to deal the killing blow; back on Earth, the other heroes of the Sentinels of Magic save the world.

Blue Devil then joins the Sentinels of Magic and becomes Faust's partner, but it is an uneasy partnership. In an apparent act of kindness, Faust restores Blue Devil's freedom by restoring to him his last missing bone. Blue Devil sacrifices his life fighting Hermes Trismegistus, but as a true devil he returns to life again. He is tasked to roam the Earth with Lucifer's Trident sending escaped demons back to Hell.

One Year Later
One Year Later Blue Devil is employed as a bouncer at the Oblivion Bar, an interdimensional place for magical beings, and there he is recruited by Ragman, Enchantress, and Detective Chimp to fight against The Spectre in Day of Vengeance. With his enhanced demonic strength, he is the heavy hitter of the Shadowpact, the assemblage of magical heroes devoted to fight for every "lost cause". This grouping is even able to wound the powerful Eclipso. Feeling necessary for the first time in a long time, he devotes himself to the team. One of their goals is to help look over the wild magic of the "Tenth Age", a direct result of the events of Day of Vengeance.

He spends the "missing year" trapped in Riverrock, Wyoming along with the rest of Shadowpact. It is a small city hidden by a blood shield by an assembly of evil magical beings called the Pentacle. There he meets, or rather meets again, Jack of Fire, a red, muscular demon. The entity is hiding a disfigured, bony face under a black bandanna, claiming to have been turned into a demon by the actions of Daniel. He further explains that the very same moment the demonic Neron granted fame and powers to Cassidy as Blue Devil, the dead parents and siblings of Patrick were dragged from Heaven to Hell.

From then on, Blue Devil's life starts going downhill: even if in his personal timeline only a few days passed, the Enchantress was forced to steal a year of life out of every Shadowpact member (and surviving Riverrock townsperson) to shatter the bloody barrier. As such, the entire world had long thought Shadowpact lost, even building a memorial statue. Having been considered dead for a year, Blue Devil struggles to rebuild his life.

Blue Devil is forced to confront Kid Devil, now granted metahuman powers by Neron himself. When questioned about his involvement in Marla's death, Blue Devil is forced to admit that his actions were what caused her death. Due to the terms of his deal with Neron, that he would become Neron's eternal servant on his 20th birthday should he lose his trust in Blue Devil, Kid Devil realizes that he is now damned, having lost all trust in Blue Devil following his confession. Kid Devil, enraged, yells at Blue Devil to stay away from him and runs off, leaving a guilt-ridden Blue Devil behind.

To add further misery to his condition, Blue Devil is demoted to the rank of a Rhyming Demon. His new position results in the heroic Earth-based angel Zauriel being sent to confront him. His demotion is explained as the paradoxical condition of his being both a hero and a demon: being famous and loved by everyone, he makes Hell a glamorous place, spurring weak minds to attain his glamour by selling their souls to Hell. Zauriel, on behalf of his good faith, takes Blue Devil's place in the Shadowpact, giving him enough time to get out of his infernal deal.

Blue Devil puts his case in the hands of an eager lawyer, more than happy to be able to confront Hell itself in a hall of justice. Blue Devil undertakes the task of completing 13 labors, as Hercules before him, on behalf of the Catholic Church as a show of good will.

Returning to Hell for the final hearing, he discovers that Jack of Fire was the one selling his sibling's soul first, with Blue Devil merely following unwillingly. His lawyer repeatedly proves that Jack is the only one who can return Cassidy's soul, and the souls of his family, back, since he was the one who sold them in the first place. Blue Devil uses his new lower status as a Rhyming Demon to force Jack to do so, but in the process he loses both Lucifer's Trident and his demon form, reverting into a mortal.

Jack of Fire is now allied with a seemingly all-powerful Sun God, but plots to betray him in retaliation for his harsh treatment and to lead an army of demons on Earth. Cassidy feels forced to don a new suit of armor, very similar to the one he wore during his Hollywood years, but even more powerful. He sets off to fight his brother, who refuses. Instead, after a brief confrontation, acknowledging that the Sun God will eventually kill him for his betrayal, he commits suicide in front of Cassidy, naming him inheritor of all his powers and demonic status - but without forfeiting his soul. Cassidy rejoins the Shadowpact to defeat the Sun God, and Zauriel ends his temporary membership with the group.

During the Reign in Hell storyline, Cassidy convinces Zatanna and Sargon the Sorcerer to take him to Hell and accompany him as to make a deal with Lord Satanus against Neron; when, after much suffering, they reach Satanus, he pleads to be incorporated into Satanus' attack force in hopes of receiving the gift of full humanity from the demon in case of his victory. Inadvertently, he brags about being capable of handling Etrigan, who is causing damage to Satanus' forces; Satanus takes heed of this and teleports him to do battle with Etrigan. Upon losing, Etrigan steals the remains of his humanity.

Later, due to the effects of the magical drug Satanus has released all over Hell, he is transformed into a human, but soulless. Etrigan, now transformed into a replica of Jason Blood, offers him his soul back, warning him the drug only worked on pureblood demons such as the type he had been transformed into when Etrigan stole his soul, meaning accepting it back meant returning to his demon shape forever. He is later traumatized by Sargon's sacrifice to let almost all heroes intervening in the War of Hell escape to Nanda Parbat and is later the only one convinced of reuniting the Shadowpact by Detective Chimp.

He appears with Zatanna and the Phantom Stranger at the desecrated grave of Batman. Black rings take control of Crispus Allen. While Zatanna is sent to gather the Justice League, Blue Devil and the Stranger attempt to stop the Black Lantern Spectre, failing miserably. He and the Stranger head to Nanda Parbat, where the Stranger helps Deadman remove the black ring from his body. Blue Devil is then tasked by the Stranger to protect the body, being told that it is of "singular importance".

The New 52

In The New 52 rebooted DC's continuity, Blue Devil is reintroduced when he busts up a drug deal and runs into Black Lightning, who is also there to bust the deal. They both state that they are trying to take down crime lord Tobias Whale, but Black Lightning does not believe Blue Devil. A fight ensues, but Blue Devil quickly gets the better of Black Lightning and tries to make him listen, when he is interrupted by the LAPD, who are ready to open fire. Black Lightning takes that opportunity to run off and Blue Devil manages to escape as well.

During the Forever Evil storyline (namely Forever Evil: Blight), Blue Devil is among the magic users that were captured by Felix Faust and Nick Necro in order to use them as part of a weapon that would defeat the creature that destroyed the Crime Syndicate's Earth.

Powers and abilities
Even before he became Blue Devil, Dan Cassidy was a highly trained martial artist and acrobat. His costume included kevlar body armor, visual and auditory amplifiers, radio gear, mini-gills allowing underwater breathing, and servo-motors which increased his strength at least twentyfold. After being grafted to Cassidy's body the costume became organic and gained the ability to self-repair at an extremely fast rate. Cassidy's abilities seem to have been changed little by his transformation into an actual demon.

In his current incarnation, Blue Devil still possesses some degree of superhuman strength, capable of going toe-to-toe with beings like Eclipso, and knocking out a power-drunk Enchantress in one punch. He is also remarkably resistant to physical damage, evidenced when Eclipso threw him a distance of approximately 500 feet upwards, he did not even require time to recover before getting up and heading back into the fight.

Originally, Blue Devil wielded a trident of his own design which included, among other things, rocket engines capable of carrying two people at high speeds. He now carries the Trident of Lucifer, which allows him to find demons on Earth and banish them to Hell. During a battle with Eclipso and the Spectre the trident was thrown into the ocean; it was recovered shortly after by Aquaman who returned it to Cassidy, and much later given to Jack of Fire.

Briefly resuming his human body with a more powerful exosuit, Cassidy is given back his trident and demonic powers by Jack of Fire, but as a "demon with a soul".

Dan's apartment in Metropolis connects to California via a closet that opens into Cain's House of Mystery. By crossing through the house, he can travel from the East Coast to the West Coast in moments.

Other versions

Kingdom Come
In Kingdom Come, there is a background character named Blue Devil II, an indigo demon who was visually based on the demon Chernabog from the Disney film Fantasia.

Tangent Comics
In the 1997 Tangent Comics one-shot Sea Devils Blue Devil lends his name to the brand of beer served at The Black Pirate pub in New Atlantis. There is also a patron of the pub seen wearing a Blue Devil T-shirt.

Future's End

In other media

Television

 Blue Devil appears in Justice League Unlimited, voiced by an uncredited Lex Lang. This version is a member of the Justice League and primarily makes non-speaking background appearances.
 Blue Devil appears in Young Justice, voiced by Troy Baker. This version is Irish and serves as an associate of the Justice League in the first two seasons before joining them in the third. In the fourth season, Blue Devil serves as the "den mother" of the League's sub-groups, the Team and the Outsiders.
 Daniel Cassidy appears in Swamp Thing, portrayed by Ian Ziering. This version made a deal with the Phantom Stranger that leaves the former trapped in Marais, Louisiana. Following a minor appearance in the episode "Worlds Apart", Cassidy visits Madame Xanadu in the episode "He Speaks" to express his desire to leave Marais and learns from her that change is coming. In the episode "Drive All Night", Daniel tries to leave Marais, but his arm bursts into blue flames at the border and he ends up in a coma. In "The Price You Pay", Cassidy recalls the deal he made before Jason Woodrue wakes him up while experimenting on him. In "The Anatomy Lesson", Cassidy recovers and becomes Blue Devil to save Abby Arcane and Liz Tremayne from Conclave's security team after the Phantom Stranger shows him the events in a vision. In "Loose Ends", Cassidy is able to leave Marais.

Miscellaneous
 Blue Devil appears in Teen Titans Go! #23.
 Blue Devil appears in issue #25 of the Justice League Unlimited tie-in comic book series.

Merchandise
Blue Devil received a figure in the DC Universe Classics line.

References

External links
 Cosmic Teams entry
 Blue Devil interview/preview on THE PULSE
Justin's Honest-to-Goodness Blue Devil Page
 The Grand Comics Database Project - Index access for Blue Devil and Blue Devil Annual

Comics characters introduced in 1984
1984 comics debuts
DC Comics characters with superhuman strength
DC Comics male superheroes
DC Comics titles
DC Comics characters with accelerated healing
Fictional characters who have made pacts with devils
Fictional polearm and spearfighters
DC Comics demons
DC Comics martial artists
DC Comics fantasy characters
Fictional stunt performers